Kirsten van der Valk (born 4 May 1994) is a Dutch female badminton player. In 2013, she became the runner-up of Slovak Open in women's singles event.

Achievements

BWF International Challenge/Series
Women's Singles

 BWF International Challenge tournament
 BWF International Series tournament
 BWF Future Series tournament

References

External links
 

1994 births
Living people
Dutch female badminton players
21st-century Dutch women